Langley is a provincial electoral district for the Legislative Assembly of British Columbia, Canada.  The riding was first contested in the 1966 general election.

The riding was created out of the Delta constituency in 1966. Until the election of 1991, it was considered a safe seat for the Social Credit Party. Since then, the BC Liberals have won the seat by significant margins in six consecutive elections. It returned one MLA from 1966 to 1986, two MLAs from 1986 to 1991, and one MLA from 1991 to the present day.

Demographics

Member of Legislative Assembly

Election results 

|-

 
|NDP
|Kathleen Stephany
|align="right"|8,400
|align="right"|35.77%
|align="right"|

|- bgcolor="white"
!align="left" colspan=3|Total
!align="right"|23,483
!align="right"|100.00%
!align="right"|
|}

|-

|-
 
|NDP
|Dean Morrison
|align="right"|8,303
|align="right"|33.64%
|align="right"|

|- bgcolor="white"
!align="left" colspan=3|Total
!align="right"|24,680
!align="right"|100.00%
!align="right"|
|}

|-

|-

 
|NDP
|Paul Latham
|align="right"|2,720
|align="right"|12.11%
|align="right"|
|align="right"|$1,961

|}

|-

 
|NDP
|Kim Richter
|align="right"|5,795
|align="right"|29.12%
|align="right"|
|align="right"|$17,136
|-

|}

|-

 
|NDP
|Derrill Thompson
|align="right"|5,762
|align="right"|31.39%
|align="right"|
|align="right"|$22,296
|-

|Independent
|Nora E. Galenzoski
|align="right"|62
|align="right"|0.34%
|align="right"|
|align="right"|$120

|}

References

External links 
BC Stats - 2001 (pdf)
Results of 2001 election (pdf)
2001 Expenditures (pdf)
Results of 1996 election
1996 Expenditures (pdf)
Results of 1991 election
1991 Expenditures
Website of the Legislative Assembly of British Columbia

British Columbia provincial electoral districts
Langley, British Columbia (district municipality)
Langley, British Columbia (city)
Provincial electoral districts in Greater Vancouver and the Fraser Valley
Politics of Langley, British Columbia (city)